The Royal Dutch Football Association (KNVB ) is the governing body of football in the Netherlands. It organises the main Dutch football leagues (Eredivisie and Eerste Divisie), the amateur leagues, the KNVB Cup, and the Dutch men's and women's national teams.

For three seasons in the 2010s, the KNVB and its Belgian counterpart operated a joint top-level women's league, the BeNe League, until the two countries dissolved the league after the 2014–15 season and re-established their own top-level leagues. The KNVB is based in the central municipality of Zeist. With over 1.2 million members the KNVB is the single largest sports association in the Netherlands.

History
In 1889, the Nederlandse Voetbal en Athletiek Bond was founded. Due to certain disagreements several football clubs ended their association with it and together to form Koninklijke Nederlandse Voetbalbond (KNVB) which was later renamed to present name. It was one of the founding members of FIFA in 1904 and one of the first non-British football association in Europe. The first Dutch football club was formed in 1879 in Haarlem. The Netherlands Football League Championship had already existed for a decade unofficially when the association was founded. The KNVB strongly disapproved the professionalism of football in 1909. It said that "it will protest against it by all means necessary." In 2012 KNVB launched an 11-point action plan, called 'Football for Everyone' to promote gay football players in coming out. It released a 30-second video named 'Gay? It doesn't matter'; prepared by broadcaster BNN. The video was also broadcast  during the Dutch national football teams World Cup qualifier match against Andorra held in October 2012.

During the 2014 FIFA World Cup, it collaborated with Royal Philips to open six football clinics across Brazil. Bert van Oostveen is the current Secretary-General of KNVB.

Management

Current sponsorships 
 Nike
 ING Group
 Heineken
 Coca-Cola
 PricewaterhouseCoopers
 Staatsloterij
 KPN
 Adecco
 Volkswagen

See also 
 Netherlands men's national football team
 Netherlands women's national football team

References

External links 

  
 KNVB.com – official website in English
 OnsOranje.nl – website of the Netherlands national football team 
 Netherlands National Football Team History at VoetbalStats.nl 
 Netherlands at FIFA site
 Netherlands at UEFA site

Dutch
Football in the Netherlands
Football
Organisations based in the Netherlands with royal patronage
1889 establishments in the Netherlands
Sports organizations established in 1889
Organisations based in Utrecht (province)
Sport in Zeist